This is a list of notable people born in or strongly associated with the Isle of Wight, alphabetically within categories.

Born on the Isle of Wight
 Dr Thomas Arnold, headmaster of Rugby School and immortalised in Tom Brown's Schooldays, born in Cowes
 King Arwald, last pagan king in England and last king of the Isle of Wight, died 686
 Lee Bradbury, ex professional footballer, currently manager of Havant and Waterlooville, born in Cowes
 Danny Briggs, Hampshire and England cricketer
 Sophie Dawes, Baronne de Feuchères, born in St Helens
 Craig Douglas (Terry Perkins) pop singer, born 1941 in Newport, topped the charts in 1959 with Only Sixteen
 Arthur Percy Morris Fleming, born 1881 in Newport, electrical engineer and pioneer in the development of radio and submarine detection
 Thomas Fleming, judge and Lord Chief Justice
 Uffa Fox, yacht designer
 Vivian Fuchs, Antarctic explorer
 Marius Goring, born Newport
 Maxwell Gray (Mary Gleed Tuttiett), novelist
 Lauran Hibberd Slacker-pop singer, born in Newport 
 Sheila Hancock, actress, born in Blackgang
 Robert Hooke, scientist, born in Freshwater
 Jeremy Irons, actor, born in Cowes and raised in St Helens
 Phill Jupitus, comedian, born in Newport
 Mark King, born in Gurnard nr. Cowes, bass player and vocalist in pop/funk band Level 42
 Suri Krishnamma, film director and writer, born in Shanklin
 Cliff Michelmore, television presenter and producer born in Cowes
 Albert Midlane, failed ironmonger, poet and hymn-writer was born in Newport
 Anthony Minghella, film director; born in Ryde; his parents run the Minghella's Ice Cream company on the Island; his film The English Patient includes footage of Shanklin Pier; on accepting his Best Picture Oscar, he said, "This is a great day for the Isle of Wight!"
 Loretta Minghella, charity executive and solicitor
 Brian Murphy, actor, born in Ventnor
 Noel Odell, geologist and mountaineer, born in St Lawrence
 Queen Osburga, daughter of Oslac, Chief Butler of England and mother of King Alfred the Great
 Arthur Cecil Pigou, economist and proponent of pigouvian taxes, born in Ryde
 Albert Pollard, historian, born in Ryde
 Horace Rawlins, golfer, winner of the first U.S. Open in 1895
 Jake Scrimshaw, professional footballer
 Henry Sewell, first Prime Minister of New Zealand, born on the island in 1807 and lived there until emigrating to New Zealand at the age of 45
 Kelly Sotherton, heptathlete, born in Newport
 Polly Toynbee, journalist, born at Yafford
 George Westmore, founder of Hollywood's first make-up department, born 1879 in Newport. His son Bud Westmore is credited as make-up artist on over 450 movies 
 Harry Frederick Whitchurch V.C., born in Sandown
 Eric Charles Twelves Wilson V.C., born in Sandown in 1912

Raised on the Isle of Wight
E. Power Biggs, concert organist
Uffa Fox, raised in Cowes
William Hutt, MP and colonial administrator, educated in Ryde
George, 2nd Earl Jellicoe, at St. Lawrence Hall, Ventnor
Donna Langley, film executive and chairwoman of Universal Pictures, raised on the island.
Fidelis Morgan, actress and writer, raised in Bonchurch
Nicholas Dingley alias Razzle, drummer for Hanoi Rocks, raised in Binstead
Algernon Charles Swinburne, poet, raised in East Dene, Bonchurch
Bear Grylls, climber, youngest Briton to reach the summit of Mount Everest and live; survival expert; host of Man vs. Wild

Lived on the Isle of Wight
Sam Browne, soldier, retired to Ryde
Master Gunner Daniel Cambridge VC (later Yeoman of the Guard), stationed at Redoubt Battery, Fort Redoubt, Freshwater Bay, until 1871 (Census)
Julia Margaret Cameron, photographer, lived in Freshwater Bay
Lewis Carroll, author, lived at Sandown while working on Alice in Wonderland
Winston Churchill, visited Ventnor for extended periods throughout his life
Helen Clare, soprano singer
Sir Christopher Cockerell, inventor of the hovercraft, spent two years in East Cowes working on his prototypes
Charles Darwin, naturalist, lived for a period in 1867 in the Kings Head Hotel in Sandown
Charles Dickens, author, lived in Bonchurch for 3 months in 1849                             
King Charles I, held prisoner in Carisbrooke Castle for a year
Ken Dodd, comedian, had a holiday home at Freshwater Bay
Jack Douglas, actor from a series of Carry On films
Trevor Duncan, composer (known for the Dr Finlay's Casebook theme), lived in Bonchurch
King Ethelred the Unready, fled to the Isle of Wight in 1012 from the Danes under Sweyn Forkbeard
Uffa Fox, yacht designer, lived in Puckaster
David Gascoyne, 20th-century surrealist poet
Pamela Green, infamous nude model of the 1950s and 1960s, lived in Yarmouth with the dambuster Douglas Webb, DFM
King Harold II and his brother Tostig Godwinson, have estates at Kern and Nunwell respectively
Jet Harris, musician with The Shadows
Peter de Heyno, defended the Carisbrooke Castle 1377 against French–Castilian troops
Robyn Hitchcock, musician, lived in Yarmouth from the mid-1980s to the early 1990s, and cited it in many of his works of the period
John Oliver Hobbes (Pearl Mary Teresa Craigie), novelist, lived part-time in Steephill, 1900–1906
Geoffrey Hughes, actor, lived in Newport
Admiral Sir John Jellicoe, lived at St. Lawrence Hall, Ventnor
John Keats, poet, moved to the island in 1814; areas of Shanklin are named after him
Kenneth Kendall, journalist and TV presenter, lived in Cowes where his partner owned an art gallery
Charles Kingsley, spent childhood there
Marek Larwood, actor and comedian
Henry Wadsworth Longfellow, American poet, spent the summer in Shanklin in 1868
Guglielmo Marconi did radio experiments in Alum Bay and Niton around 1900
Karl Marx, lodged in Ryde in the 1870s and in Ventnor in the 1880s
John Milne, inventor of the horizontal pendulum seismograph, retired from the Japanese Imperial College of Engineering in Shide, Isle of Wight
David Niven, actor, lived in Bembridge as a child
Isaac Pitman, invented a shorthand system, lived for a time in Sandown
J.B. Priestley, author, playwright and broadcaster, lived at Brook for over a decade from 1948
John Morgan Richards, cigarette and patent medicine entrepreneur, lived in Steephill, 1903–1918
Legh Richmond, preacher and writer of the religious tract The Dairyman's Daughter, curate for Yaverland and Brading
Frederick Riddle, viola player, died in Newport
John Edward Bernard Seely, 1st Baron Mottistone, Secretary of State for War in the years leading up to the First World War; MP and Justice of the Peace for the Isle of Wight
Michael Sheard, actor, lived in Ryde
Algernon Charles Swinburne, poet, lived in Bonchurch
 Shaw Taylor, television presenter, known for the catchphrase "keep 'em peeled", lived in Totland
Alfred, Lord Tennyson, poet, lived in Farringford in Freshwater Bay
Former Prime Minister Margaret Thatcher, rented a house in Seaview
Edward Upward, long-lived author and part of the Auden Group in the 1930s, lived in Sandown from 1961 to 2004
Queen Victoria, had one of her residences at Osborne House in East Cowes
Barnes Wallis, inventor of the bouncing bomb, lived and worked in Cowes
Douglas Webb, DFM air gunner with 617 Squadron on the Dambusters raid; partner of the infamous nude model Pamela Green; lived in Yarmouth

Currently resident
Raymond Allen, television scriptwriter best known for Some Mothers Do 'Ave 'Em, born and lives in Ryde
 Jack Barnes, musician and personality
 Keegan Brown, professional darts player
 Patrick Buckland, CEO of Stainless Games, creator of Carmageddon
 Hester Chambers, founding member of Wet Leg
 Sarah Close, singer-songwriter and YouTuber, born and lives on the island
 Melvyn Hayes, actor, lives in Ryde
 David Icke, conspiracy theorist, lives in Ryde
 Mark King, Level 42 musician
 Dame Ellen MacArthur, sailor, based in Cowes
 The Osbourne family have a holiday home in Yaverland
 Dick Taylor, founding member of The Rolling Stones and the Pretty Things
 Rhian Teasdale, founding member of Wet Leg
 Alan Titchmarsh, author and TV presenter
 M J Trow, author and teacher

References

 
Isle of Wight
People